Buddy Brown is an American country music singer-songwriter who first achieved prominence with a number of viral videos on YouTube.

Early life 
Brown was born on May 12, 1982, in Madison, Mississippi, a suburb of Jackson. When Brown was nine years old, his family decided to relocate to Orlando, Florida for his father's career. In 2005, he graduated from Mississippi State with a degree in Psychology.

Career 
On October 13, 2009, he released a cover of Easton Corbin's "A Little More Country Than That" that went viral. A year later, he opened up for country singer John Anderson in Wildwood, Florida.

On July 4, 2012, he released his first album titled Mason Jar. His fan base pushed his first full-length CD to No. 34 on the iTunes country chart without a record deal. March 11, 2014, he released a self-titled EP, Buddy Brown. On October 14, 2014, Buddy released his second EP, Keepin' It Country. This EP reached No. 12 on the iTunes charts. In January 2014, Billboard put Keepin' It Country on their Heat Seekers Albums list. USA Today published a story on Brown, labeling him as a "YouTube Sensation." His single "Takin' You Huntin'" landed him a spot on the front page and an online feature in The Clarion-Ledger.

On April 21, 2015, he released his third EP, Hometown Anthems. This EP landed at No. 28 on iTunes. He joined artists Chase Rice and Dee Jay Silver in May of that year to perform at the NASCAR Talladega Motor Speedway. He previously performed for more than 10,000 in a pre-race concert at Talladega in May 2013. On July 24–25, 2015, he performed at Boo Fest, a charity golf tournament. In the fall of 2015, Brown joined the College Town Throw Down Tour lineup, which included Justin Moore, Jon Pardi, Easton Corbin, Joe Nichols and Brothers Osborne. He later opened up for Pardi at the Clay County Fairgrounds in Green Cove Springs, Florida in October 2015. On July 22, 2016, he opened for Pardi again at the Muscatine County Fair.

In February 2016, Brown released his fourth EP, Hurricane Stomp. The EP peaked at No. 16 on iTunes-US and No. 8 in Canada. The EP was featured on New Artist Spotlight and landed on Billboard's sales chart as one of the two top independent releases of the week. Brown released another independent EP, I Call BS on That, on October 7, 2016. The EP debuted at No. 1 on the iTunes Top Country Album chart and landed at No. 22 on the Billboard Album chart. The live announcement video of I Call BS on That reached 10.9 Million views on Facebook. After releasing the EP, Brown gained 18,000 fans in just one week. The acoustic video of the track had 3.1 million views and 75,000 shares. Brown currently has over 25 million views of his YouTube videos. In addition to his YouTube success, Brown has over 630,000 social media followers.

Discography

Extended plays

Albums

References 

1982 births
Living people
American country singer-songwriters
Musicians from Orlando, Florida
American male singer-songwriters
American country guitarists
American male guitarists
People from Madison, Mississippi
21st-century American guitarists
Singer-songwriters from Florida
Singer-songwriters from Mississippi
Guitarists from Florida
Guitarists from Mississippi
Country musicians from Mississippi
Country musicians from Florida
21st-century American male singers
21st-century American singers